The 2018 season of the Telangana T20 League, also known as Venkataswamy T20 tournament, was the first edition of the TTL, a professional Twenty20 cricket league in Telangana, India. The league was formed by the Hyderabad Cricket Association (HYCA) in 2017. After Tamil Nadu and Karnataka, Telangana became third state in South India to launch its state T20 league with an initiative to provide major boost to rural cricketers who lag behind dur to lack of proper infrastructure and coaching facilities. The owners of the teams competing in the league are announced on 13 January 2018 by HYCA who have been selected on a first-come-first-serve basis after submitting an Expression of Interest and paying Rs 12.5 lakh each to HYCA for one-year contract. The team colours and logos were launched on 2 February 2018 with the inaugural match being held on 3 February at Rajiv Gandhi International Cricket Stadium, Hyderabad

Adilabad Tigers won the inaugural tournament beating Medak Mavericks by 9 runs and Hitesh Yadav was adjudged as the man of the match for the Final.

Teams

Source:

Tournament results

Points rable
  advanced to the knock-out stage

Source:TTL Website

Hyderabad Thunderbolts along with Rangareddy Risers, Adilabad Tigers and Medak Mavericks moved into semifinals of Telangana T20 tournament.

Knockout stage

References

2018 in Indian cricket
Cricket leagues in India
Sport in Telangana